The Mya Tha Lun Pagoda is a Buddhist pagoda and the landmark of Magway which is located on the river side of the Irrawaddy.

History 
According to legend, the pagoda was initially built by a wealthy man called U Baw Gyaw and his wife. It is famous because The Bed of Buddha is placed inside it.

References

Pagodas in Myanmar
Magway Region